The Pine Hill Haints are an American traditional bluegrass/folk/honky tonk/country band from Alabama, though the band members themselves describe their unique southern roots music as "Alabama Ghost Music."

The Haints are composed of Jamie Barrier on guitar and vocals,  Katie "Kat" Barrier on mandolin, singing saw, and washboard, Stevie LaBlanc on washtub bass, Justin Ward on accordion and trombone, and Brian "Zero" Borden on snare drum.

Current line-up
 Jamie Barrier - vocals, guitar, fiddle, harmonica
 Katie "Kat" Barrier – washboard, mandolin, saw
 Matt Bakula - vocals, washtub, tenor banjo
 Stevie LaBlanc - washtub, banjo, harmonica
 Brian "Zero" Borden - snare
 Justin Ward - accordion, trombone

Former members
 Travis Hightower - washtub
 Matt Bakula - washtub, tenor banjo
 Ben Rhyne – snare
 Joey Barrier - banjo
 Sarah Nelson - accordion
 Roger Holcombe - snare
 Rymodee - saw
 Bradley Williams - washtub
 Jeremy Dale Henderson- snare
 Matt Comer- snare
 Mike Posey - accordion
 Jon Lucious - accordion
 J.R. Collins - snare

Musical style
The Pine Hill Haints perform music they consider to be "dead" in the modern world, hence their self-proclaimed "Ghost Music." Some examples of the genres they perform include (but are not limited to) gospel, rockabilly, rock and roll, celtic music, blues music, and bluegrass. While their catalog of songs comprises mainly original material, the band has also been known to cover traditional gospel (Where The Soul Of Man Never Dies, Where The Roses Never Fade), cowboy (I Ride An Old Paint, Back In The Saddle Again), and folk (Goodnight Irene, Oh! Suzanna/Camptown Races) songs.

In addition to their live instruments, the band also utilizes a number of traditional American folk music instruments (such as a fiddle, harmonica, tenor banjo, mandolin, saw, and accordion) on their recordings. Occasionally, members of the Haints will swap instruments or abandon his or her primary instrument altogether, instead performing on one of the aforementioned instruments for a song or two. The band has several former members, and depending on how many happen to be present at a performance, surprise guest performers may accompany the Haints onstage. Such impromptu reunion performances are not completely unexpected at their shows.

Discography

See also
This Bike Is A Pipe Bomb, J.D. Wilkes

References

External links
The Official Pine Hill Haints Myspace
Razorcake Issue 32

K Records artists
Musical groups from Alabama
Musical groups established in 2000
American folk musical groups